Corbett's/Eby's Mill Bridge is a historic structure located northeast of Scotch Grove, Iowa, United States. James S. Applegate established a gristmill near this location in 1858. He was joined by John Corbett, who obtained ownership by 1868 and expanded the operation and added a sawmill. He petitioned the Jones County Board of Supervisors for an iron bridge at this location in 1870. They agreed to pay two-thirds of the construction costs with the final third paid for by local subscriptions. The contract to construct this bridge and a similar span in Monticello was made with Miller, Jamison & Company of Cleveland. Both are single span bowstring truss bridges that were completed in November 1871. This bridge has always been identified with the mill. Samuel Eby acquired it in 1875, and it remained in the family until 1913. The bridge was originally on a loop road that circled behind the mill pond. When County Road X73 was created in 1958 it bypassed the bridge to the south. The bridge has been under private ownership ever since. It was listed on the National Register of Historic Places in 1985.

See also

List of bridges documented by the Historic American Engineering Record in Iowa
List of bridges on the National Register of Historic Places in Iowa
National Register of Historic Places listings in Jones County, Iowa

References

External links

Bridges completed in 1871
Bridges in Jones County, Iowa
Historic American Engineering Record in Iowa
National Register of Historic Places in Jones County, Iowa
Road bridges on the National Register of Historic Places in Iowa
Truss bridges in Iowa
Bowstring truss bridges in the United States
1871 establishments in Iowa